Bear Head Lake is an unorganized territory in Saint Louis County, Minnesota, United States. At the 2000 census, the population was five.

Nearby places include Babbitt, Embarrass, Waasa Township, and Eagles Nest Township.

Geography
According to the United States Census Bureau, the unorganized territory has a total area of 35.4 square miles (91.8 km2), of which 33.1 square miles (85.8 km2) is land and 2.3 square miles (6.0 km2) is water. The total area is 6.55% water.

Demographics
As of the census of 2000, there were 5 people, 2 households, and 2 families living in the unorganized territory. The population density was 0.2 people per square mile (0.1/km2). There were eight housing units (of which six were unoccupied) for an average density of 0.2/sq mi (0.1/km2). The racial makeup of the unorganized territory was 100.00% White.

There were 2 households in the territory, each being a married couple aged between 45 and 64. One of the two households had an 18- to 24-year-old male living with them.

The median income for a household in the unorganized territory was $18,750, and the per capita income for the unorganized territory was $9,225. No one in the territory was below the poverty line.

References

Populated places in St. Louis County, Minnesota
Unorganized territories in Minnesota